Safdar Hussain (died 1989) was a Pakistani musician who composed playback melodies for Urdu and Punjabi Lollywood films in the decades from 1950s to 1980s.
He is known for composing music for movies like, Heer (1955), Ishq-e-Laila (1957), and Nooran (1957). Some of his notable compositions include "Assan Jan Kay Meet Lei Akh Way, Jhoti Mooti Da Pa Leya Kakh Way" (Singer: Zubaida Khanum), "Laila O Laila, Shehar Khoobaan Laila" (Singer: Zubaida Khanum), "Wekhya Howay Ni Kisay Takya Howay, Ucha Jeya Shamla" (Singer: Noor Jehan), and others.

Career
Safdar's debut movie as a music director was Heer. It was directed by Nazir and released in 1955. Safdar was introduced to the filmmaker by the musician Rashid Attre who was also his uncle. The tracks of the film were hits and helped Safdar to start a music career in Lollywood. In 1957, he gave music for the film, "Ishq-e-Laila", which is considered the biggest ever musical movie in the history of Pakistani cinema. The film included record fourteen songs and almost all of them became classics. Another milestone in Safdar's career was a Punjabi movie, "Nooran". Most of its songs were vocalized by Noor Jehan and became popular at the time.

As a music director, Safdar composed music for 76 Urdu and Punjabi movies. His last movie, "Meri Awaz", was released in 1987.

Popular compositions
 1955 (Film: Heer - Punjabi) ... Sanu Sajna Day Milnay Di Tang A Seenay Wich Wajji Ishqay Di Taang, Singer(s): Inayat Hussain Bhatti, Poet: Hazeen Qadri
 1955 (Film: Heer - Punjabi) ... Assan Jan Kay Meet Lei Akh Way, Jhooti Mooti Da Pa Leya Kakh Way, Singer(s): Zubaida Khanum, Poet: Hazin Qadri
 1955 (Film: Heer - Punjabi) ... Baddal Nu Hath Lawan Tay Uddi Uddi Jawan Hawa Day Naal, Singer(s): Munawar Sultana & Co., Poet: Hazin Qadri
 1955 (Film: Heer - Punjabi) ... Dhol Dillay Da Jani Ajjay Nein Aya Day Kay Dard Nishani, Singer(s): Zubaida Khanum, Poet: Hazin Qadri
 1957 (Film: Ishq-e-Laila - Urdu) ... Mohabbat Ka Janaza Ja Raha Hay, Singer(s): Inayat Hussain Bhatti, Poet: Qateel Shafai
 1957 (Film: Ishq-e-Laila - Urdu) ... Sitaro Tum To So Jao Preshan Raat Sari Hay, Singer(s): Iqbal Bano, Music: Safdar Hussain, Poet: Qateel Shafai
 1967 (Film: Shab Bakhair - Urdu) ... Teray Gham Say Mohabbat Ho Gayi Hay, Sittam Sehnay Ki Aadat, Singer(s): Mala Begum, Poet: Fayyaz Hashmi
 1969 (Film: Dulla Haidari - Punjabi) ... Bazi Jitt Leyi O Jind Pyar Day Naven La Kay, Singer(s): Noor Jehan, Poet: Khawaja Pervaiz
 1972 (Film: Thah - Punjabi) ... Pehli Wari Ajj Unhan Akhian Nay Takiya Eikho Jeya Takya, Singer(s): Ghulam Ali, Poet: Waris Ludhyanvi
 1972 (Film: Thah - Punjabi) ... Teray Milan Nu Ayi Barhay Chah Kar Kay, Aa Seenay Naal Lagg Ja, Singer(s): Noor Jehan, Poet: Waris Ludhyanvi
 1974 (Film: Khatarnak - Punjabi) ... Teray Sadqay Way Dildara Ajj Mukian Ne Tangan Pyar Dian, Singer(s): Noor Jahan, Poet: Khawaja Parvaiz
 1976 (Film: Wardat - Punjabi) ... Koi Kar Kay Bahana Sanu Mill Mahi Way Raatan Aa Geyan Chananiyan, Singer(s): Mala, Poet: Qateel Shifai
 1978 (Film: Ghunda - Punjabi) ... Hor Sunao Sajno Ki Haal Chaal Ay, Singer(s): Masood Rana, Poet: Khawaja Pervaiz

Death
Safdar died on March 24, 1989 in Lahore.

References

Year of birth unknown
1989 deaths
Pakistani composers
Pakistani film score composers